A privy council is a body that advises the head of state of a state, typically, but not always, in the context of a monarchic government. The word "privy" means "private" or "secret"; thus, a privy council was originally a committee of the monarch's closest advisors to give confidential advice on state affairs.

Privy councils

Functioning privy councils

Former or dormant privy councils

See also

 Privy Council of the Habsburg Netherlands
 Council of State
 Crown Council
 Executive Council (Commonwealth countries)
 Privy Council ministry
 State Council

References

 
Advisory councils for heads of state
Monarchy
Royal and noble courts